Richard Neill Walker (born 9 November 1971) is an English former footballer.

External links

1971 births
Living people
English footballers
Notts County F.C. players
Mansfield Town F.C. players
Hereford United F.C. players
Cheltenham Town F.C. players
Footballers from Derby
Association football central defenders